Capel Township is a township in Sioux County, Iowa, USA.

References

Sioux County, Iowa
Townships in Iowa